Calophyllum bifurcatum is a species of flowering plant in the Calophyllaceae family. It is found only in West Papua in Indonesia.

References

Vulnerable plants
bifurcatum
Flora of Western New Guinea
Taxonomy articles created by Polbot